The 1973 season was the Hawthorn Football Club's 49th season in the Victorian Football League and 72nd overall.

Fixture

Premiership season

Ladder

References

Hawthorn Football Club seasons